Konchi is a small Village/hamlet in Sangamner Taluka in Ahmednagar District of Maharashtra State, India.  It comes under Konchi Panchayath. It belongs to Khandesh and Northern Maharashtra region . It belongs to Nashik Division . It is located 79 KM towards North from District head quarters Ahmednagar. 16 KM from Sangamner. 197 KM from State capital Mumbai.

References 

Villages in Ahmednagar district